Nyctonympha cribrata is a species of beetle in the family Cerambycidae. It was described by Thomson in 1868. It is known from Colombia.

References

Forsteriini
Beetles described in 1868